Sri Aurobindo Ashram is a temple of Sri Aurobindo and The Mother of Sri Aurobindo Ashram Pondicherry. It is situated on National Highway No.7 only 16 km from Rewa near Allahabad in Madhya Pradesh (India). Sri Aurobindo's sacred relics were installed here on 31.11.1975 on the auspicious day of Deepawali. Since then, Sri Aurobindo Bal Vidya Mandir (the school), Mira Aditi Shishu Chhatrawas (the hostel), Sri Aurobindo Library, Aradhana (the community kitchen) and Sadhana (the guest house) have evolved as component parts of Ma Mandir.

Characteristic Features 
(a) Ma Mandir is a meeting place of two revolutions-the Green-"Harit Kranti" & the Gold-"Divya Kranti".
 
(b) It is also the fusing point of the outer fire and the inner fire.
 
(c) It is again the meeting point of two rebirths – "Jayantigram" and "SriAurobindogram".

(a) The two revolutions:-

There is an interesting story behind the two revolutions that were taking place almost simultaneously. People of this village, formerly known as Mahasua, had been living in poverty since generations. Many of them worked as labours in the feudal form of society. After the independence, a great urge was seen in them to liberate themselves from this slavery. By providential help and favorable circumstances, they were freed and their small agricultural holdings were regained from the possessions of the moneylenders and landlords. In 1965-66 villagers faced unprecedented draught when almost half of Madhya Pradesh state was stricken by a horrible famine. These marginal farmers in possession of tiny pieces of lands as the only means of livelihood could not sow a single grain for want of rain and suffered from starvation.

A disciple of the Mother and Sri Aurobindo in this village wrote to the Mother about the calamitous situation and begged for the relief. The Mother soon responded to his prayer and sent her blessing packet. The petals in the blessing packet were mixed with a small quantity of wheat and sown in one acre area of land. The land was irrigated with water drawn in buckets from deep wells. With Mothers grace and to everyone's surprise, the miracle happened. A bumper crop, such as never seen before, came up in the parched land. The yield was incredible, which was more than the usual yield of 10 Acres of land at that time. And the famine stricken village became the origin of Green Revolution in Rewa Division. Now, with passage of time many who worked as labourer are in possession of tractors, zeeps, cars and their own harvesting machine, implements, tube wells. Pukka buildings have replaced the thatched roof huts.

(b) The fusing of the outer fire and the inner fire:-

On 6 February 1960, the village school suddenly caught fire at about 5 O’clock in the evening. The village people ran up with ladders and buckets of water to douse the fire. By the time they could extinguish it another house belonging to one of the devotee of the Mother caught fire causing panic in the village. That too was controlled but within a span of few hours yet another house caught fire. This mysterious phenomenon continued for eight days in different places of the village in full presence of police and hundreds of people. Villagers then decided to place Mothers calendar in each house and sent 4 to 5 urgent telegrams daily to the Mother praying her to intervene. After a week, the Mother's power intervened and the attack of hostile power ceased and normalcy was restored.

But the other part of the story is equally thrilling and marvelous. It is the story of outpouring of Mothers grace and aspiration of villagers for the Divine Mother to take charge of their lives. The outer fire ignited the inner fire in the villagers. The Mother power stole through the innocent hearts with unquenching thirst for the inner flame. One night a devotee saw in his vision that Sri Aurobindo has come to his village with several of his disciples from different parts of the earth. They were all assembled in the place where the Ma Mandir is situated now and Sri Aurobindo was seated in a temple which had a resemblance with Ma Mandir. Sri Aurobindo's disciples were rendering Savitri extempore like a munificent flow of divine power, peace and bliss from a higher domain of consciousness around Ma Mandir.

(c) The two rebirths:- – (Jayantigram and SriAurbindogram)

The Harit Kranti (Green Revolution) had put the spotlight on the village and as a result of it many of the government developmental schemes were implemented. The government was satisfied with the spirit with which the village people laboured to implementation these schemes and brought about an overall socio-economic development of the region. As a result, the government of M.P in the Silver Jubilee year of the Indian independence in 1972 renamed this village as the ‘Jayatigram’. In the same year i.e. 1972 which was also the Sri Aurobindo's birth centenary year the Mother blessed this village with a new name ‘Sri Aurobindogram’ for reasons still unknown. Sri Aurobindogram is Hindi translation of Auroville. The mystery is yet to be resolved if there is any inner link between the two. Ma Mandir is the Psychic heart of Sri Aurobindogram.

Matri Mandir of Auroville and Ma Mandir of Sri Aurobindogram
There is a striking similarity between the inception of Matri Mandir and Ma Mandir in so for as both have descended from subtle world without any human pre-plans and designs. Both were seen almost in the same periods, i.e. in seventies of twentieth century. The Mother saw Auroville in vision first in her very young age as the most beautiful place in the world from the point of physical material nature- ‘park with water and trees … palms and ferns, all varieties of palms,’ (Mother's agenda Vol. VI page 140). She saw it frequently later in seventies in much detail and discussed about the plan of Auroville and Matri Mandir with the architects and suggested changes from time to time to reconcile with her vision. The Mother told in her talk of 21 September 1966 (see Mother's agenda Vol. VII) that the birth of Auroville was not preceded by any thought, it was a force acting. It came as an answer to the present day human folly of creating formidable means of catastrophe... I had a revelation in the sense that it was more on the order of a vision.’ Ma Mandir too was seen almost at the same time in so distinct and powerful vision. It radiated tremendous power of Light illuminating the world.

The inception of Ma Mandir and its growth 

The story of inception of Ma Mandir is not only very interesting but all full of inner significance. It was in 1958 when one night as mentioned above Sri Aurobindo appeared in a vision to have come in this village, then called Mahasua. He was seated on an abode which looked like a temple and existed exactly at the place where Ma Mandir is now situated. Again in 1969 in a very distinct vision, Ma Mandir was seen located exactly at the place where it was built later in 1975. Mother’s diamond light was seen emerging suddenly from its central abode – The ‘Garva Mandir’ pervading and illuminating the universe as if thousands of suns were in the sky. This was interpreted that some unprecedented power has descended at the temple. The vision was so distinct and captivating that an outline of the structure was drawn and sent to the Mother to know what it exactly meant. And the Mother identifying it wrote back-

'Ma Mandir'

Blessings

- The Mother

This proved to be the choicest Grace for the village people. Ma Mandir which was seen in the subtle world had to be materialized. So the work was started to build it in 1972 without any aid, plane or expertise simply by laymen, women and village children. Ardent aspiration was the only plane and expertise with them. After completion Ma Mandir was inaugurated on 3 November 1975 the day of light (Deepawali) with the installation of sacred relics of Sri Aurobindo. Later several of its component parts, such as Chhatravas, Sri Aurobindo pustakalaya, Aradhana Bhavan, Sadhana Bhavan and a small dairy were developed. Ma Mandir has beautiful premises with greenery and plantation all around.

Aims of Ma Mandir 

Ma Mandir aims at fulfilling the objectives of Sri Aurobindo yoga.

(a) Divinization of life individually and collectively.

(b) Growing a nursery of higher consciousness for the new creation.

(c) Creating an egoless society.

Divinization of life:-

Sri Aurobindo yoga is not a spiritual discipline of renunciation of life and hard Tapashya. Its aim is not even to seek salvation in self or the extinction in the "Nirvana" by negating life and its meaning. Instead of killing the senses, it tries to strengthen and divinize them by transformation of lower nature. In all the conventional spiritual disciplines, a barrier was erected between the inner and the outer life resulting in division of human personality into different compartments. This separation of inner from the outer is the central cause of the whole problem which prevents man from realizing the godhead that he really is. For this divinization, Sadhana proceeds in 4 stages that go on simultaneously and consecutively at the same time.

(i) The Ascent of consciousness

(ii) Awakening of psychic being

(iii) The descent of consciousness

(iv) Manifestation of consciousness and transformation of entire nature.

(i) The ascent of consciousness is practiced by constant prayer and meditation and by the yoga of Karma, Bhakti and Gyana. The yoga of Surrender helps the process of awakening and raising the occult and spiritual forces latent in the mental, vital and material planes of our being. By constant practice, the consciousness ascends from ‘Muladhar’ (The material plexus) to ‘Shahasra’ (The spiritual Plexus) till it attains the supreme consciousness i.e. the Supramental consciousness.

(ii) The awakening of psychic being is most important in Sri Aurobindo yoga. The psychic being is the grain of divinity hidden and latent behind our mind, life and body. It supports their outward play. By intense aspiration and constant surrender the psychic can be awakened and brought in the front to lead the outer life to the process of purification and transformation.

(iii) The descent of conciseness from spiritual planes to the mental, vital and material planes of life takes place as an answer to the call or aspiration for a higher life. Once the psychic is in the front, the descent becomes possible because the psychic being deepens the aspiration more and more and the divine consciousness percolates stage by stage from the superconscient to the subconscient and the inconscient. It makes a bridge between the spirit and the matter through subtle centers of energy called "Chakras". The frequent phenomenon of ascent and descent makes the transformation of human nature possible. This also effectively reconciles the contradiction of spiritual and the material life, which is the cause of most of the problems in human life.

(vi) Manifestation and transformation is the ultimate result of joining the two ends of human consciousness – spirit and matter. The divinity manifests with the descent and establishment of Supramental consciousness on earth consciousness both individually and collectively.

Nursery of higher consciousness for the new creation:-

After the descent and manifestation of Supramental consciousness on earth in 1956 the whole Creation has started reacting, receiving or repelling it. Ma Mandir has a providential grace to have instruments and medium to receive the downpour of this supreme light and power. It is this grace that has led us to start Mira Aditi Shishu Chhatravas-the hostel of small children, who constantly bathe in the sunshine of this gracious light. The children are brought up in the beautiful campus of Ma. Mandir and exposed to the vibrant atmosphere of Sri Aurobindo's sacred relics and the Mother's presence. Miraculous things are taking place in shaping these children of tomorrow. They may prove the seedlings of the new creation. The hostel is small laboratory of divine consciousness where experiments are going on individually and collectively on the effects, actions and reactions of the descent of divine power. The results, so for, are satisfactory.

Creating an egoless and supporting society:-

Ma Mandir aims not at individual ‘Siddhi’ or salvation. It strives to prepare ground for creating an egoless society on the principle of unity in diversity. To create such an ideal society, individual and collective ‘Sadhana’ is indispensable without distinction of caste, creed, sex, nationality or status. Such a society has to evolve purely on the principles of equality of opportunity and liberty, on the choice of work done for the benefit of humanity. Mutual understanding nourished by divine love will be the basis for community life. There will be no temptation for private property and profit.

Publications 

'The Ma Mandir Jankalyan Trust' Mahasua publishes books related to 'Sri Aurobindo Yoga' in easy Hindi. The list of publications till date is as follows:

 Sri Arvind-Sri Ma aur unaki Sadhana, Pushpa-1
 Sri Arvind-Sri Ma aur unaki Sadhana, Pushpa-2
 Sri Arvind-Sri Ma aur unaki Sadhana, Pushpa-3
 Sri Arvind-Sri Ma aur unaki Sadhana, Pushpa-4
 Evolution towards Human Unity (A Comparative Study)
 Pushpanjali
 Atmanjali
 Ma-Kripa
 Dyan kaise karen
 Abhipsa ki aag kaise jalaye
 chaitya-purus kaise jagaye
 Sri Arvind-Sri Ma aur unka yoga(Que-Ans. series)
 Sri Arvind yoga ki sadhana kaise karen
 Sakti avataran ka rahasya
 Savitri ke vibhinna vigrah
 Savitri-Ek Parichaya
 Savitri-Ek Peeda
 Savitri-Ek Srijan
 Savitri-Ek Marma
 Savitri-Ek Prakash
 Savitri-Ek Sadhana
 Savitri-Ek Pyash
 Savitri-Ek Kranti
 Savitri(Hindi Translation-in Prose)
 Savitri Ki Amrit Saritayen
 Dharti Ke Aansu(A Novel)
 Kisanma(A poetry in 'Bagheli' dialect)
 A Digest to Sri Aurobindo Yoga

See also
Sri Aurobindo
The Mother
Auroville
Sri Aurobindo International School
The Mother's International School
Integral education
Arya (journal)
Collected Works of Sri Aurobindo

References

 K N Verma, Ma Mandir Ki Kahani, Sri Aurobindo Ashram, Mahasua,
 Publications,Ma Mandir Jankalyan Trust, Mahasua

External links 

 Official Website 
 WordpressBlog
 Ma Mandir Videos
 Facebook Page

Sri Aurobindo
Ashrams
New Age organizations
Integral thought
Schools affiliated with the Sri Aurobindo Ashram